Bárbara Heliodora may refer to:
 Bárbara Heliodora (theatre critic)
 Bárbara Heliodora (poet)